Holiday Songs and Lullabies is a studio album by American singer-songwriter and musician Shawn Colvin. It was released in 1998 on Columbia Records.

Tracks
"In the Bleak Midwinter" (Traditional) – 4:04
"Christmas Time Is Here" (Vince Guaraldi, Lee Mendelson) – 2:37
"Now the Day Is Over" (Traditional) – 1:47
"Rocking" (Traditional) – 2:33
"Windy Nights" (Robert Louis Stevenson, Alec Wilder) – 3:10
"All Through the Night" (Traditional) – 2:03
"Love Came Down at Christmas" (Traditional) – 3:04
"Silent Night" (Josef Mohr, Franz Gruber) – 3:22
"All the Pretty Li'l Horses" (Traditional) – 1:43
"Little Road to Bethlehem" (Michael Head, Margaret Rose) – 2:52
"Seal Lullaby" (Rudyard Kipling, Alec Wilder) – 2:29
"Evening Is a Little Boy/The Night Will Never Stay" (Eleanor Farjeon, Frances Frost, Alec Wilder) – 3:09
"The Christ Child's Lullaby" (Traditional) – 2:19
"Close Your Eyes" (Johannes Brahms, William Engvick) – 1:39

Sequel
A sequel "The Starlighter" is due for release February 23, 2018

Personnel
Shawn Colvin – vocals, guitar
Larry Campbell – mandolin, pedal steel guitar, fiddle
Andy Hess – bass
Ben Street – bass
Mark Egan – bass
Steuart Smith – guitar
Shawn Pelton – drums
Dan Petty – guitar, lap steel guitar
Doug Petty – organ, piano
Paul Frazier – background vocals
Marlon Saunders – background vocals
Jill Seifers – background vocals
Clark Gayton – euphonium
John Clark – French horn
David Taylor – bass trombone
Jim Pugh – trombone
Kenny Rampton – flugelhorn
John Owens – flugelhorn
Alan J. Stepansky – cello
Sandra Park – violin
Sharon Yamada – violin
Rebecca Young – viola
Rev. Dan Willis – oboe
Production notes:
Doug Petty – producer, arranger, string and brass arrangements
Maurice Sendak – artwork
Alec Wilder – arranger
Aaron Keane – engineer
Steve Addabbo – engineer
Ray Martin – engineer
Fred Remmert – engineer
Noah Simon – assistant engineer
George Morgan – assistant engineer
Matt Kane – assistant engineer
Joe Ferla – mixing
Greg Calbi – mastering
Neil Kellerhouse – design
Mary Maurer – art direction, design
Deborah Feingold – photography

Chart positions

References

Shawn Colvin albums
1998 Christmas albums
Christmas albums by American artists
Folk Christmas albums
Columbia Records Christmas albums